Progressive nodular histiocytoma is a cutaneous condition characterized by generalized, discrete yellow papules and nodules with prominent facial involvement.

See also 
 Generalized eruptive histiocytoma
 List of cutaneous conditions

References 

Dermal and subcutaneous growths